The National Soccer League 1984 season was the eighth season of the National Soccer League in Australia.   This season saw a restructure of the league, introducing a split into two geographical divisions, and an expansion from 16 to 24 teams.  A Northern Conference comprised 12 clubs from New South Wales and Australian Capital Territory, and a Southern Conference consisted of 12 Victorian, South Australian, and Queensland clubs.

This season also saw the introduction of the two well-supported Croatian clubs, Melbourne Croatia and Sydney Croatia, both of which had had recent success in the state-leagues.

For the first time in the competition, a finals system was introduced, whereby the five highest finishing teams in each conference had a playoff to determine a conference winner.  The two conference winners then played each other in a two-legged Grand Final to be declared champions.  The Grand Final was won by South Melbourne over Sydney Olympic.

League tables
Northern Conference

Southern Conference

Finals series

Northern Conference

Southern Conference

Grand Final

South Melbourne win 4–2 on aggregate

Individual awards

Player of the Year: Sergio Melta (Adelaide City)
U-21 Player of the Year: Tony Franken (Canberra City)
Top Scorer(s): Doug Brown (South Melbourne – 22 goals)
Coach of the Year: Eddie Thomson (Sydney City)

References
OzFootball Archives – 1984 NSL Season

National Soccer League (Australia) seasons
1
Aus